Begur is a village and municipality in the comarca of Baix Empordà and province of Girona in Catalonia, Spain.

The municipality of Begur has 3,986 inhabitants (according to the census of 2005). It is an important tourist attraction in the Baix Empordà. During the summer, the population can exceed 40,000 people.

Despite its tourist character, the village has important historical remnants that go back in early history. The castle of Begur is a good example of medieval remains. The castle was constructed in the 16th and 17th centuries.

The municipality of Begur also includes Esclanyà  (with a Romanesque old part), Aiguafreda, Sa Riera, Sa Tuna, Aiguablava and Fornells. Some of the most prestigious beaches of the Costa Brava can be found here: Sa Riera, Aiguafreda, sa Tuna, Platja Fonda (although it has been almost completely destroyed by storms), Fornells and Aiguablava. The latter is also home to a Parador Hotel.

The annual festival to celebrate St. Tania takes places each November.

The village of Begur is a staging point on the GR 92 long distance footpath, which runs the length of the Mediterranean coast of Spain.

Geography
Besides the village of Begur itself, the municipality includes the following populated places:
Aiguablava

Fornells
Sa Riera

References

Population data

External links
Official website
Official website for tourists
The international website of Begur
 Government data pages 

Municipalities in Baix Empordà
Cittaslow
Populated places in Baix Empordà
Populated coastal places in Spain